Chogha Sabz-e Khoda Nazar (also Romanized as Choghā Sabz-e Khodā Naz̧ar; also known as Khodā Naz̧ar-e Choghā Sabz and Choghā Sabz and Choqā-ye Sabz) is a village in Suri Rural District, Suri District, Rumeshkhan County, Lorestan Province, Iran. It lies between the villages of Towhid Suri to the north-west and Asadabad to the southeast. At the 2006 census, its population was 496, in 100 families.

References 

Populated places in Rumeshkhan County